There are currently 11 restaurants in Scotland with a Michelin star rating, a rating system used by the Michelin Guide to grade restaurants based on their quality.

List of Michelin-starred restaurants in Scotland

See also 
 Complete list of Michelin three-starred restaurants
 List of Michelin three-starred restaurants in the United Kingdom
 Lists of restaurants

References

External links 
 Michelin Red Guide
 2017 Michelin Guide for Great Britain & Ireland
 Visit Scotland website for Michelin Restaurants

Michelin starred restaurants in Scotland
 
Scottish cuisine-related lists